Cambrian Hall is a private school located in the district of Dehradun, now the capital of Indian state of Uttarakhand. Cambrian Hall is a residential day, co-educational English Medium School. It is certified by the Council for the Indian School Certificate Examinations (CISCE), New Delhi.

Cambrian Hall is located  close to the Indian Military Academy and Forest Research Institute of India. Founded in 1954 by Col. Shashi Jung Bahadur Rana, the school is now run by a board, which comprises members of the founding family, educators, and prominent citizens.

Today, the School has 1600+ boys and girls studying in Cambrian Hall and has attached hostels, hospital, sports arenas and grounds.

The school has two academic blocks, Jodha Block and Doutre Block. Jodha block houses 8th to 12th grades and has fully equipped modern laboratories for Computer Sciences, Chemistry, Biology and Home Sciences. The Doutre Block houses 3rd to 7th grades, an Art room, Junior Library and a computer sciences lab. There is a separate block for Nur, KG, 1st and 2nd grade.

There is also an Experimental block which has Open Air Theatre, Dance room and music rooms and the Senior Library. The school has a large auditorium that can accommodate almost 1000 students.

The hostel for boarders is called the Shashi Block. The hostel has modern dining halls and a hygienic kitchen. Students are provided accommodation in dormitories according to their age and House Colours. The Principal, Vice-Principal, Bursar, Estate Supervisor, Kitchen in-charges and house masters live in the same campus but in separate quarters.

Sports play an integral role in the manifestation of a child's character. School arranges for a wide range of games for students like Hockey, Football, Cricket, Basket Ball, Volley Ball, Badminton, Cross Country, Athletics, P.T., Gymnastics and Table Tennis.

Alumni
 Bipin Rawat, (Chief of Army Staff of the Indian Army)
 Rajesh Kumar (Actor)
 Udita Goswami (actor)
 Shruti Ulfat

External links
 Official website
 Alumni

References

Primary schools in India
High schools and secondary schools in Uttarakhand
Boarding schools in Uttarakhand
Schools in Dehradun
Educational institutions established in 1954
1954 establishments in Uttar Pradesh